Elisabeth Tieber (born 4 July 1990) is an Austrian football defender who plays for FC Neunkirch in the Swiss Nationalliga A and the Austria women's national football team.

Club career
Tieber started her career as a youth player at SV Andritz. After that she played in Austria at DFC LUV Graz  USC Landhaus and JSV Mariatrost. In the summer of 2010 she joined VfL Sindelfingen in Germany. After a year back at Sturm Graz in Austria, she transferred to Switzerland: first at FC Luzern and later at FC Neunkirch starting in February 2015.

International career
Tieber has represented Austria on the Austria women's national football team since 2008. Her debut was on 21 June 2008 in the home game against Norway in the qualifying round for the 2009 UEFA Women's Championship. She was subbed in for Irene Fuhrmann in minute 58. One A-international match later she scored her first goal against Israel. She previously represented her country at the U19 level.

References

External links 
 Elisabeth Tieber at UEFA.com

1990 births
Living people
FC Neunkirch players
Austrian women's footballers
Austria women's international footballers
Expatriate women's footballers in Switzerland
Women's association football defenders
ÖFB-Frauenliga players
USC Landhaus Wien players
Swiss Women's Super League players
SK Sturm Graz (women) players
DFC LUV Graz players
FC Luzern Frauen players